Stony Hill School may refer to:

Stony Hill School (Windsor, Connecticut), listed on the National Register of Historic Places in Hartford County, Connecticut
Stony Hill School (Waubeka, Wisconsin), listed on the National Register of Historic Places in Ozaukee County, Wisconsin